Rigging may refer to:

Nautical
Rigging, the system of ropes, cables and chains, which support the mast(s) of a sailing vessel and which adjust the position of the vessel's sails and the spars to which they are attached.
Standing rigging, the rigging that supports masts on sailing vessels.
Running rigging, the rigging that is used to adjust the position of sails.
Rowing apparatus in a boat, see Glossary of rowing terms

Other
Rigging (material handling), any form of lifting gear, tackle, equipment for moving heavy loads over short distances, etc. and the procedures of lifting and moving heavy loads.
Rigging (parachuting), the collective name for any tasks related to the assembly, inspection, maintenance and repair of parachuting equipment. The person trained for those tasks is called a rigger.
Entertainment rigging, rigging used for lights, curtains, and other equipment in exposed-structure venues, including theatres, arenas, convention centers, ballrooms, warehouses, etc.
 Theatrical rigging, as used in live-stage theatres and similar venues, more specifically
 Aerial rigging, setting up apparatus for circus aerial acts, such as trapeze
Vote rigging, illegally interfering in the counting of votes in an election
Rodeo bareback rigging, riding equipment
Skeletal rigging, the preparation of a 3D graphics model (mesh) for animation, by programming points of articulation in the figure

See also 
 
 
 Rig (disambiguation)
 Rigged, original title of Fight Night (film)
 Rigged, a 2007 book by Ben Mezrich